Ivan Santini (born 21 May 1989) is a Croatian professional footballer who plays as a forward for Swiss club Zürich.

Club career
Ivan Santini, born in Zadar, played for his hometown side's youth team, until the summer of 2006, when he moved to Inter Zaprešić where he signed his first professional contract and made four first team appearances, scoring his first professional goal in the process. The next season, he moved to Red Bull Salzburg where he spent the duration of the year as a youth player.

He made his debut on the professional league level in the 2. Bundesliga for Ingolstadt on 8 March 2009, when he came on as a substitute in the 72nd minute in a game against TSV 1860 München and scored his first goal. From 2009 to 2012, he played for Zadar. On 31 January 2012, Santini joined SC Freiburg on a six-month loan move with a clause in which Freiburg could buy out his contract.

In June 2013, he signed a contract to join Kortrijk.

On 18 June 2015, Santini moved to Standard Liège on a four-year contract, for a fee of €2 million. In the final of the Belgian Cup in 2016, Santini scored a goal in the 88th minute of the match to secure a dramatic 2–1 win over Club Brugge.

On 3 August 2016, Santini moved to Caen on a three-year contract, for a fee estimated over €2 million. In January 2017, he became the second Croatian player after Dado Pršo to score at least ten goals in Ligue 1.

Anderlecht 
On 3 July 2018, he moved to Anderlecht on a three-year contract for €3 million fee.
He debuted on 13 July 2018 in a friendly match against Ajax and scored two goals.
In his official debut, on 28 July 2018, he scored a hat-trick against his former club Kortrijk.

On 5 August 2018, he scored his second hat-trick of the season against Oostende.
 On 12 August 2018, he scored the second goal in a 2–1 win against Charleroi. He finished the 2018–19 season as the club's top scorer with 16 league goals.

Jiangsu Suning 
On 29 July 2019, Santini joined Chinese Super League club Jiangsu Suning, becoming their fifth and final allotted foreign born player for the season. On 24 October 2020, Santini's ninth minute strike against Chongqing Lifan secured Jiangsu Suning a place in the semi-finals of the 2020 Chinese Super League play-offs against 2018 title winners Shanghai SIPG. Santini was a substitute in the second-leg of the CSL final against Guangzhou Evergrande on 12 November, coming on in the 80th minute for goalscorer Éder. The club held on to a 2–1 win which confirmed Jiangsu Suning as league champions for the first time in their history.

NK Osijek 
On 13 February 2021, Santini returned to Croatia to sign with Prva HNL side NK Osijek. He scored the winning goal on his debut for the club against Varaždin on 26 February.

Al-Fateh 
On 10 August 2021, Santini joined Saudi Arabian club Al-Fateh.

Zürich 
On 29 June 2022, he joined Swiss side Zürich.

International career
Santini made his debut for Croatia in a May 2017 friendly match against Mexico and earned a total of 5 caps, scoring no goals. In May 2018, he was shortlisted on Croatia's preliminary 32-man squad for the 2018 World Cup in Russia, but did not make the final 23.

His final international was an October 2018 friendly against Jordan.

Career statistics

Club

Personal life
His brother Krševan plays as a goalkeeper. Their father is the late singer Romeo Santini.

Honours 
Inter Zaprešić
 Druga HNL: 2006–07

Standard Liege
 Belgian Cup: 2015–16

Jiangsu Suning
 Chinese Super League: 2020

Individual
 Prva HNL Player of the Year: 2010–11

References

External links
 

1989 births
Living people
Sportspeople from Zadar
Croatian people of Italian descent
Association football forwards
Croatian footballers
Croatia youth international footballers
Croatia international footballers
NK Inter Zaprešić players
FC Ingolstadt 04 players
NK Zadar players
SC Freiburg players
K.V. Kortrijk players
Standard Liège players
Stade Malherbe Caen players
R.S.C. Anderlecht players
Jiangsu F.C. players
NK Osijek players
Al-Fateh SC players
FC Zürich players
Croatian Football League players
2. Bundesliga players
Bundesliga players
Belgian Pro League players
Ligue 1 players
Chinese Super League players
Saudi Professional League players
Swiss Super League players
Croatian expatriate footballers
Croatian expatriate sportspeople in Austria
Expatriate footballers in Austria
Croatian expatriate sportspeople in Germany
Expatriate footballers in Germany
Croatian expatriate sportspeople in Belgium
Expatriate footballers in Belgium
Croatian expatriate sportspeople in France
Expatriate footballers in France
Croatian expatriate sportspeople in China
Expatriate footballers in China
Croatian expatriate sportspeople in Saudi Arabia
Expatriate footballers in Saudi Arabia
Croatian expatriate sportspeople in Switzerland
Expatriate footballers in Switzerland